Events from the year 1503 in art.

Events
 Leonardo da Vinci probably begins painting the Mona Lisa in Florence
 Giuliano Bugiardini joins the painter's guild in Florence
 First record of Matthias Grünewald painting

Works

 Mariotto Albertinelli – The Visitation of the Virgin
 Albrecht Dürer – Great Piece of Turf (Das große Rasenstück, watercolor)
 Filippino Lippi – Mystical Marriage of St. Catherine
 Pietro Perugino – Combat of Love and Chastity
 Raphael – Madonna and Child with the Book (approximate date)
 Luca Signorelli – Portrait of Vitelozzo Vitelli
 Master of Frankfurt – Holy Kinship (Historical Museum, Frankfurt)
 Madonna of Laroque, perhaps by Leonardo da Vinci

Births
 Agnolo di Cosimo, Italian Mannerist painter from Florence (died 1572)
 Pedro Campaña, Flemish painter of the Renaissance period (died 1586)
 Paul Dax, Austrian artist (died 1561)
 Parmigianino, Italian Mannerist painter and printmaker (died 1540)
 Augustin Hirschvogel, German artist, mathematician, and cartographer known primarily for his etchings (died 1553)
 Giovanni Battista Scultori,  Italian painter, sculptor and engraver (died 1575)
 Michele Tosini, Italian painter of the Renaissance and Mannerist period, who worked in Florence (died 1577)

Deaths
 Israhel van Meckenem, German printmaker and goldsmith (born 1445)
 1502/1503: Giovanni Donato da Montorfano, Italian painter (born 1460)

 
Years of the 16th century in art
1500s in art